Yohanan Petrovsky-Shtern (born April 6, 1962) is an American historian, philologist and essayist, noted in particular for his studies of the institution of Cantonism, his critique of Aleksandr Solzhenitsyn's controversial two volume-work about Jews in Russia, Two Hundred Years Together, as well as translations of Jorge Luis Borges' works into Russian. He is the Crown Family Professor of Jewish Studies and a Professor of Jewish History in History Department at Northwestern University where he teaches Early Modern, Modern and East European Jewish history.

Biography
Petrovsky-Shtern was born in Kiev in 1962 to the family of Miron Petrovsky (Петровський Мирон Семенович), a Ukrainian philologist. His birth name was Ivan Petrovsky, as attested by his published translations of Jorge Luis Borges.

Scholar
He holds a Doctor of Philosophy (PhD) in Comparative Literature from Moscow University and a second Doctor of Philosophy (PhD) in Jewish History from Brandeis University. He has been a Rothschild Fellow at Hebrew University in Jerusalem, a Sensibar Visiting Professor at Spertus Institute for Jewish Learning and Leadership in Chicago, a Visiting Scholar at École des Hautes Études en Sciences Sociales, a research fellow at The National Endowment for the Humanities, in Poland, and a Fulbright Scholar at Kyiv Mohyla Academy in Kyiv.

Artist
Petrovsky-Shtern had several solo exhibitions, including such venues as the French Institute in July 2019 in Kyiv, Ukraine; the Ukrainian Institute of America in spring 2015 in New York City; Ukrainian Institute of Modern Art in February–March 2014 in Chicago; and in November 2012 at the museum of the Spertus Institute for Jewish Learning and Leadership in Chicago.

Petrovsky-Shtern analyses the folkways and fantasies of his Jewish and Ukrainian heritage through “revisiting foundational narratives from the Hebrew Bible, Eastern European Jewish folk-characters and folk-tales, images and artifacts from his native Ukraine, and—of course—the Holocaust,” wrote Jerome Chanes in Jewish Week. 

“Although Petrovsky-Shtern’s main fields of interest are history and literature, ranging from the Jewish Middle Ages to Hasidic folklore, from the prose of Gabriel Garcia Marquez to the Ukrainian renaissance of the 1920s, it is on canvas that the depth of his knowledge of various religions and cultures is transformed into a mysterious world of tales and myths,” wrote the poet Vasyl Makhno.

Awards 
 2016 - The Kosciuszko Visiting Professor at the University of Warsaw, Collegium de Artes Liberales
 2015 - The American Publishers Awards for Professional and Scholarly Excellence (PROSE Awards), Honorable Mention
 2014 - Nomination for 2015 Pulitzer Prize for The Golden Age Shtetl
2014 - National Jewish Book Award in the History category for The Golden Age Shtetl: A New History of Jewish Life in East Europe
 2007 - Institute for Advanced Studies at Hebrew University of Jerusalem, Visiting Scholar Fellowship
 2006 - National Endowment for the Humanities Summer Fellowship
 2003—2006 - The Davis Center for Russian Studies, Harvard University, Fellow
 1993 - Research Fellowship, Center for Russian and Eastern European Studies (CREES), University of Toronto

Publications
Among his publications are many scholarly articles and such monographs as:
 
 
 
 , which provided the first grassroots social, economic, and cultural history of the shtetl.

References

External links
Official page, Northwestern University
 
 

1962 births
20th-century historians
21st-century American historians
Northwestern University faculty
American historians of religion
Translators of Jorge Luis Borges
Living people
Moscow State University alumni
Brandeis University alumni
Writers from Kyiv
Translators from Spanish
21st-century American male writers
Jewish American academics
Ukrainian emigrants to the United States
American essayists